A Pentatonix Christmas Tour was the sixth concert tour by American a cappella group Pentatonix to promote their fifth studio album, A Pentatonix Christmas. The tour began on December 3, 2017 in Chicago, and concluded on December 22, 2017 in Boston.

Background and development
On August 21, 2017, the group announced they were re-releasing A Pentatonix Christmas with a deluxe version of the album, along with a limited 12 date tour. Additional dates for Uncasville and Boston were announced due to high demand.

Tour dates

Notes

References

2017 concert tours
Pentatonix concert tours